Jared Christopher Lum (born 19 July 1992) is an Australian professional soccer player who plays as a midfielder and is currently a free agent. He last played for Hong Kong side Eastern.

Club career
In 2010, Lum joined Marconi Stallions, where he was earmarked as one of the club's most promising players, after graduating from the Australian Institute of Sport.

Lum signed for Hong Kong Premier League club Kitchee on 11 January 2016.

On 26 May 2018, Lum revealed that he had re-signed for another two years.

On 25 June 2020, it was revealed that Lum would leave Kitchee after 4.5 years and would sign for another HKPL club R&F. On 14 October 2020, Lum left the club after his club's withdrawal from the HKPL in the new season.

On 19 November 2020, Lum joined Eastern. He left the club on 9 July 2022.

International career
In May 2017, Lum was called up to the Fiji to play New Caledonia. However, there remained some doubt at the time as to whether he was eligible to play on the basis of his Fijian ancestry. In a later interview, Lum revealed that he was not interested in playing for Fiji as he thought that the football in Fiji was not professional enough.

In March 2020, Lum said in an interview that one of his goals was to represent Hong Kong.

Personal life
Lum's paternal grandmother is a Hongkonger who grew up in Happy Valley and moved to Fiji at age 10, where she met his paternal grandfather who is also ethnically Chinese. His father was born in Fiji and the family emigrated to Sydney when he was two.

On his mother's side, his maternal grandparents are Scottish and moved to Australia in 1969. Lum's parents met when they were attending high school together in Sydney.

Lum married his wife Nelly in 2016 and has two sons.

Honours

Club
Kitchee
 Hong Kong Premier League: 2016–17, 2017–18
 Hong Kong Senior Shield: 2016–17, 2018–19
 Hong Kong FA Cup: 2016–17, 2017–18, 2018–19
Hong Kong Sapling Cup: 2017–18
 HKFA League Cup: 2015–16

International
Australia
 AFF U-16 Youth Championship: 2008

References

External links

1992 births
Living people
Sydney FC players
Kitchee SC players
R&F (Hong Kong) players
Eastern Sports Club footballers
Soccer players from Sydney
Australian expatriate soccer players
Australian expatriate sportspeople in Hong Kong
Expatriate footballers in Hong Kong
National Premier Leagues players
Hong Kong Premier League players
Association football midfielders
Australian people of Fijian descent
Australian people of Scottish descent
Australian soccer players